Thalia Tran is an American actress best known for her roles as Little Noi in Raya and the Last Dragon (2021), Charlotte Perry in Council of Dads (2020) and Raina in Little (2019). She has also appeared in Tiny Feminists (2016), Brat TV's Hotel Du Loone (2018) and Disney Channel's Sydney to the Max (2020).

Early life
Tran was born in Newport Beach, California. She is of Southeast Asian descent. As a child, Tran took vocal lessons. Her vocal teacher recommended for her to take acting lessons to improve her performance skills. She is also able to play the piano and guitar.

Filmography

References

External links

Living people
21st-century American actresses
Actresses from Newport Beach, California
American child actresses
American film actresses
American people of Vietnamese descent
American television actresses

American actresses of Asian descent
Year of birth missing (living people)